The Ministry of Interior is a ministry of the Government of South Sudan. The incumbent minister is Gen. Aleu Ayieny Aleu 

Part of the ministry are the police, fire brigade, and prison services.

List of Ministers of Interior

References

Interior
South Sudan, Interior